The Prix Walo is the most important award in Swiss show business. It is known as the "Swiss Oscar".

Awards since 1994

Honorable - Walo - awards 
 1983: Charly Fritsche
 1991: Eynar Grabowsky
 1992: Willi Schmidt, First Harmonic Brass Band
 1993: Caterina Valente, Ettore Cella
 1994: Alfredo, Adolf Stähli
 1995: Wysel Gyr, Vico Torriani, Artur Beul
 1996: Anne-Marie Blanc
 1997: ?
 1998: Lilo Pulver, Hannes Schmidhauser
 1999: Fredy Knie senior
 2000: Dimitri
 2001: Hazy Osterwald
 2002: Walo Lüönd
 2003: César Keiser und Margrit Läubli
 2004: Conelli Conny Gasser, Herbi Lips und Urs Pfister
 2005: Trudi Gerster
 2006: Walter Roderer
 2007: Lys Assia
 2008: Nella Martinetti
 2009: Elisabeth Schnell und Ueli Beck
 2010: Hans Leutenegger
 2013: Jörg Schneider

Award: public preferred artists   
 1974: Hazy Osterwald
 1975: Hans Gmür und Karl Suter
 1976: Peter, Sue & Marc
 1977: Kurt Felix
 1978: Ruedi Walter und Margrit Rainer
 1979: Kliby und Caroline
 1980: Pepe Lienhard
 1981: Emil
 1982: Beni Thurnheer
 1983: Walter Roderer
 1984: Beny Rehmann
 1985: Cabaret Rotstift
 1986: Ruedi Walter
 1987: Ursula Schaeppi und Walter Andreas Müller
 1988: Walter Roderer
 1989: Furbaz
 1990: Peter Reber
 1991: Vreni und Rudi
 1992: Marcocello
 1993: Peach Weber
 1994: Birgit Steinegger
 1995: Fascht e Familie
 1996: DJ Bobo
 1997: Schmirinskis
 1998: Gölä und Band
 1999: Francine Jordi
 2000: Francine Jordi
 2001: Schmirinskis
 2002: Francine Jordi und Florian Ast
 2003: Sven Epiney
 2004: Roman Kilchsperger
 2005: Francine Jordi
 2006: Stephanie Glaser
 2007: Jodlerklub Wiesenberg
 2008: Oesch’s die Dritten
 2009: Cabaret Divertimento
 2010: Monique
 2011: Patricia Boser
 2012: Luca Häni
 2013: Furbaz
 2014: Cabaret Divertimento
 2015: Sabine Dahinden 
 2016: Viola Tami
 2017: Stefan Gubser
 2018: Kurt Aeschbacher

Comedy/cabaret 
 1994: Acapickels
 1995: Geschwister Pfister
 1996: Massimo Rocchi
 1997: Duo Fischbach
 1998: Marco Rima
 1999: Ursus & Nadeschkin
 2000: Flügzüg
 2001: Mölä und Stahli
 2002: Marco Rima
 2003: Lorenz Keiser
 2004: Andreas Thiel
 2005: Marco Rima
 2006: Cabaret Divertimento
 2007: Bagatello
 2008: Simon Enzler
 2009: Cabaret Divertimento
 2010: Claudio Zuccolini

Newcomer 
 1999: Subzonic
 2000: Daniel Fohrler
 2001: Susanne Kunz
 2002: Plüsch
 2003: Mia Aegerter
 2004: Baschi
 2005: Daniel Kandlbauer
 2006: Cornelia Bösch
 2007: Stefanie Heinzmann
 2008: Sophie Hunger
 2009: Lea Lu
 2010: Steff la Cheffe
 2011: Bastian Baker

Pop/Rock 
 1999: Gotthard
 2000: Martin Schenkel
 2001: ?
 2002: Polo Hofer
 2003: -
 2004: Plüsch
 2005: Adrian Stern
 2006: Lovebugs
 2007: Stephan Eicher
 2008: Bligg
 2009: Seven
 2010: Adrian Stern

Radio-, TV- and Filmproductions  
 1994: Pingu Film
 1995: Fascht e Familie TV 
 1996: Katzendiebe Film
 1997: Viktors Spätprogramm TV 
 1998: Apéro  (SR DRS) Radio
 1999: Benissimo TV
 2000: Viktors Spätprogramm TV
 2001: Total Birgit TV
 2002: Aeschbacher with Kurt Aeschbacher TV
 2003: Lüthi und Blanc (soap opera) TV
 2003: Achtung, fertig, Charlie! Film
 2004: Berg und Geist (3sat, [SF]) TV
 2004: Sternenberg Film
 2005: Mein Name ist Eugen Film
 2006: Glanz & Gloria TV
 2006: Die Herbstzeitlosen Film
 2007: Die grössten Schweizer Hits TV
 2007: Chrigu Film
 2008: Giacobbo/Müller TV
 2008: Auf der Strecke Film
 2009: La Bohéme im Hochhaus TV
 2009: Die Standesbeamtin Film
 2010: Kampf der Chöre TV
 2010: Sennentuntschi Film

Actors on TV and film 
 1994: Sue Matthys
 1995: Jörg Schneider
 1996: Mathias Gnädinger
 1997: Inigo Gallo
 1998: Bruno Ganz
 1999: Christian Kohlund
 2000: Erich Vock
 2001: ?
 2002: Walter Andreas Müller
 2003: Esther Gemsch
 2004: Bruno Ganz
 2005: Mike Müller
 2006: Stephanie Glaser
 2007: Anatole Taubman
 2008: Sabina Schneebeli
 2009: Erich Vock
 2010: Hanspeter Müller-Drossaart

Popular hits/ (folk music), popular swiss country music 
 1994: Peter Reber
 1995: Carlo Brunner
 1996: Peter Zinsli
 1997: Leonard
 1998: Francine Jordi
 1999: Francine Jordi
 2000: Carlo Brunner
 2000: ?
 2002: Ruedi Rymann
 2003: Streichmusik Alder
 2004: Hans Aregger
 2005: Carlo Brunner
 2006: ChueLee
 2007: Jodlerklub Wiesenberg
 2008: Oesch’s die Dritten
 2009: Yasmine-Mélanie
 2010: Nicolas Senn

Other  categories  
In these categories  the award is not given every year or is no more given:

Artists (Clowns), (Circus) 
 1994: Louis Knie
 1995: Dimitri
 1996: Ursus & Nadeschkin
 1998: Karls kühne Gassenschau

Country/Blues/Roots 
 1995: John Brack
 2005: John Brack
 2008: Philipp Fankhauser
 2011: C.H. (Kisha, Reto Burrell, Rickenbacher)

Dance 
 2005: DJ Tatana

DJ/Hip Hop 
 2002: DJ Tatana
 2009: Greis
 2010: Bligg

International success 
 1995: DJ BoBo

Jazz/Gospel/Boogie-Woogie 
 1995: Bo Katzman

Writers for TV,  TV-moderators  
 1994: Charles Lewinsky
 1996: Viktor Giacobbo
 1997: Beni Thurnheer

Music award  
 2001: Gotthard

Pop 
 1994: DJ BoBo
 1995: Sina
 1996: Florian Ast
 1997: DJ BoBo
 1998: Kisha
 2003: Lunik

Rock 
 1994: Züri West
 1995: Polo Hofer
 1996: Gotthard
 1997: Gotthard
 1998: Gölä
 2003: Patent Ochsner

Popular hits / french "Chanson" 
 1994: Dodo Hug
 1999: Toni Vescoli
 2006: ChueLee

Cirkus, Theater and Musical 
 1994: Keep Cool
 1995: Space Dream
 1998: Circus Monti
 2000: Circus Monti
 2006: Karls kühne Gassenschau
 2007: Ewigi Liebi
 2008: -
 2009: Die kleine Niederdorfoper
 2010: Dällebach Kari

Special events 
 2010: Open Air Hoch-Ybrig

References

Swiss awards